Thornaby Football Club are a football club based in Thornaby, Stockton-on-Tees, England.

History
The club was established in 1980 when Stockton Cricket Club's football team joined the Wearside Football League. The club were known as Stockton until 2000.

In 2005–06, they finished 17th out of 21 in the Northern League Division One, but were demoted to Northern League Division Two due to the poor quality of their ground. Their ground, Teesdale Park, was formally Head Wrightson athletic ground and was a cricket field.

Manager Ray Morton was appointed in season 2008–09. They finished 20th in season 2008–09 and reached the quarter finals of the Ernest Armstrong Second Division Cup being beaten by eventual finalists Sunderland RCA. In season 2009–10 they reached the final of the Ernest Armstrong 2nd division cup being beaten 3–1 in extra time by Whitehaven A.F.C. having played all the second half and extra time with 10 players due to a sending off after 47 mins. In season 2010–11 they finished 14th.  In June 2012 they appointed Neil Radigan as manager for season  2012–13 initially with Ray Morton as assistant but he was replaced with Paul Edwards in September 2012 and  they finished 19th and also the same position in season 2013–14. In May 2014 for season 2014–15 they appointed Paul Edwards as manager who had been assistant to Neil Radigan since 2012 with Mark Horkan as assistant, they finished season 2014–15 in 7th position the highest for several years.
 
The ground has seen widespread  development – security fencing has been erected and the Teesdale Park site now has a teen shelter, fitness trail, nature trail and some wooden owl statues funded  from a National Lottery Community spaces lottery grant to enable the site to be developed for the community. The Football club have also been given funding for a new community room by the Stockton council run Eastern area partnership board, the ground has hosted a forest school on the Park for local schools and groups and a recent grant from the FA has seen the changing rooms and floodlights upgraded to high standards. The club were awarded the Northern league hospitality award in 2014.

In season 2015–16 they finished 7th in Division 2 and reached the semi finals of the North Riding Cup being defeated by Middlesbrough FC the winners. In season 2016–17 manager Paul Edwards resigned in late August, with his assistant Mark Harkin taking over. He resigned in mid October 2016 and was replaced by experienced manager Paul Burton who left in July 2017.

The club established its first women's teams in the summer of 2021. The Women's first team currently competes in the North Riding Women's Football League, Premier Division. Home fixtures are also played at Teasdale Park. Their U16 girls competed in the Russell Foster Premier Division, winning the league shield and North Riding County Cup in their first season.

Honours
Northern League Division Two
Champions 1987–88, 1991–92
Ernest Armstrong Cup Runners up 2009–10

Records
FA Cup
Fourth Qualifying Round 1992–93
FA Vase
Third Round 1997–98

References

External links

Football clubs in England
Northern Football League
Association football clubs established in 1980
Football clubs in North Yorkshire
1980 establishments in England
Thornaby-on-Tees
Sport in the Borough of Stockton-on-Tees